National Police Commissary F.C., previously known as Military Police F.C., is an association football club from Sihanoukville, Cambodia. They won the Cambodian League in 2000.

Current squad

Achievements
Cambodian League: 1
 Champion (1): 2000
Hun Sen Cup: 1
 Champion (1): 2014

References

External links
 General-Commissariat of National Police FC at Soccerway
 

Football clubs in Cambodia
Sport in Phnom Penh
Police association football clubs